Arubolana imula is a species of crustacean in the family Cirolanidae, endemic to Aruba. It was described in 1979 by Lazare Botosaneanu and Jan Hendrik Stock.

Appearance

(As described by Lazare Botosaneanu and Jan Hendrik Stock) 

"Male and female 6.25 mm. Body 2.3 times longer than wide. Eyes absent. Antenna reaching posteriorly to pereonite(segment) 4 or 5. Rostrum distinct, anteriorly truncate, separating antennal bases, fused with rectangular frontal lamina ventrally. Pleotelson basally slightly wider than long, posterior margin broadly rounded to subtruncate, with irregular crenulations or faint teeth. Uropodal exopod apically acute, reaching to about midlength of endopod; latter distally broad; with slight tooth at distolateral angle."

References

Cymothoida
Fauna of Aruba
Taxonomy articles created by Polbot
Crustaceans described in 1979